Willis Lake is a lake that is located northeast of Pumpkin Hollow, New York. Fish species present in the lake are pumpkinseed sunfish, largemouth bass, yellow perch, and brown bullhead. There is access by trail from Pumpkin Hollow Road.

References

Lakes of New York (state)
Lakes of Hamilton County, New York